Santosh Kautika Tarfe is a member of the 13th Maharashtra Legislative Assembly.He was made MLA by Rajeev Satav after Satav became MP in 2014 He represents the Kalamnuri Assembly Constituency. He belongs to the Indian National Congress (INC).

Personal life
He is son in law of former INC minister Shivajirao Moghe.

Career
He has been president of Maharashtra State Tribal Youth Welfare Organisation. He joined the INC in February, 2012.

Controversy
In September 2013, case was filed against Tarfe for abetting suicide of a tribal Raju Munjaji Vibhute (aged 23), son of RTI activist Munjaji Vibhute, belonging to Brahman Wadi, of Aundha Nagnath Taluka, Hingoli district, on a complaint filed by his widow. He was absconding in police records according to a news report dated 12 September 2013.

References

Maharashtra MLAs 2014–2019
People from Hingoli district
Marathi politicians
Year of birth missing (living people)
Living people
Indian National Congress politicians from Maharashtra